Ramankary is a village in the Kuttanad region of India. It is 9 km away from Changanacherry town and 17 km from Alappuzha city. It is one of the villages in Alapuzha on the bank of the Manimala River with picturesque vast paddy fields.

Geography
The villages bordering Ramankary include Veliyanau on the north, Mampuzhakkary on the east, Manalady on west and Vezhapra on south.

History
There is no recorded history on the origin of this land. But the oral history among local people, transferred from generation to generation is a blend of myths and legends. There is reference to Kuttanad in the epic Mahabharata of ancient India. During their exile, the five Pandava princes are said to have traveled through this land. In those days, Kuttanad was part of a dense forest, later destroyed by a forest fire which is also mentioned in the epic. Thus came the place name Chuttanad or the burnt place. In course of time Chuttanad became Kuttanad. One can still see 'kari' or coal if we dig deep into the soil of Kuttanad, pointing to the fact that the place was once a forest, destroyed by wild fire. Ramankary is one of the places latter renamed to end with 'kari' which refers the Malayalam word for charcoal .

During the reign of Chera dynasty that ruled over ancient Kerala, Kuttanad attained an important place in history. One of the powerful kings in the dynasty: Cheran Chenguttavan is said to have ruled his vast kingdom from Kuttanad, when it was also a famous centre of Buddhism.

Ramankary also has a Dharmashasta (Ayyappa) temple.

Administration

Wards
Ramankary Grama Panchayat comes under Veliyanad Block Panchayat and it is divided into 13 wards.
 Manalady
 Ramankary North
 Ramankary Town
 Mampuzhakary West
 Mampuzhakary Centre
 Mampuzhakary South
 Oorukkary North
 Puthukkary
 Oorukkary
 Vezhapra East
 Vezhapra Centre
 Vezhapra West

Demography
The Ramankary village has population of 10755 of which 5187 are males while 5568 are females as per Population Census 2011. In Ramankary village population of children with age 0-6 is 1077 which makes up 10.01% of total population of village. Average Sex Ratio of Ramankary village is 1073 which is lower than Kerala state average of 1084. Child Sex Ratio for the Ramankary as per census is 958, lower than Kerala average of 964. Ramankary village has higher literacy rate compared to Kerala. In 2011, literacy rate of Ramankary village was 98.02% compared to 94.00% of Kerala. In Ramankary Male literacy stands at 98.25% while female literacy rate was 97.80%. Schedule Caste (SC) constitutes 14.80% while Schedule Tribe (ST) were 0.11% of total population in Ramankary village.

Points of interest
 Dharmashastha Temple
 District Educational Office of Kuttanadu Educational District
 First Class Judicial Magistrates Court
 Govt. Lower Primary School
 NSS Higher Secondary School
 St Joseph's Church

Notable people 

 Nagavally R S Kurup - Writer/ Film Director
 Venu Nagavalli - Film Director/Actor

References 

Villages in Alappuzha district